Hyalophysa is a genus of apostome ciliates of the family Foettingeriidae.

References 

Oligohymenophorea
Ciliate genera